Herménégilde Chiasson  (born 7 April 1946) is a Canadian poet, playwright and visual artist of Acadian origin. Born in Saint-Simon, New Brunswick, he was the 29th Lieutenant Governor of New Brunswick between 2003 and 2009.  He is also currently a professor at Université de Moncton.

Education
 Bachelor of Arts, Université de Moncton (1967)
 Bachelor of Fine Arts, Mount Allison University (1972)
 Masters in Esthetics, University of Paris (Sorbonne), (1975)
 Master of Fine Arts, State University of New York, Visual Studies Workshop in Rochester, New York (1981)
 Doctorate, University of Paris (Sorbonne), (1983)
He was made a Grand Officer of the National Order of Merit (France) as per the Canada Gazette of 26 November 2011.

Career and private life
He is married to Marcia (Babineau) with one daughter, Sara-Jane. He served in many positions (director, playwright, journalist, researcher) with Radio-Canada from 1968 until 1985. During this time, he also made many contributions to the cultural framework of New Brunswick: directing the Galerie d'art de l'Université de Moncton in 1974, serving as President of the Galerie sans nom in 1980, helping found the Editions Perce Neige in 1984 and the Aberdeen Co-op in 1985. He worked on several such projects after leaving Radio-Canada before becoming a professor of the history of Art and Cinema at the Université de Moncton in 1988. He is a member of the Royal Canadian Academy of Arts In 2017 Chiasson received the biennial Strathbutler Award for visual art in New Brunswick.

Bibliography

Poetry
 Mourir à Scoudouc (1974)
 Rapport sur l’état de mes illusions (1976) 
 Climat (1996) (English translation: Climate.)
 Conversations (1999) (Winner of the 1999 Governor General's Literary Award for poetry.)

Theatre
 Cap Enragé (1992)
 L'exil d'Alexa (1993)
 Aliénor (1998)
 Le Christ est apparu au Gun Club (2005)

Arms

Documentary 

 2016 - Herménégilde Chiasson, de ruptures en contraintes (realisation Ginette Pellerin)

References

External links
Herménégilde Chiasson's entry in The Canadian Encyclopedia
 Acadie.com Herménégilde Chiasson bio

1946 births
Living people
Knights of Justice of the Order of St John
Lieutenant Governors of New Brunswick
Acadian people
20th-century Canadian dramatists and playwrights
Canadian literary critics
20th-century Canadian poets
Canadian male poets
Canadian Roman Catholics
Canadian poets in French
Canadian book editors
Journalists from New Brunswick
People from Gloucester County, New Brunswick
Roman Catholic writers
Mount Allison University alumni
Université de Moncton alumni
University of Paris alumni
Visual Studies Workshop alumni
Academic staff of the Université de Moncton
Members of the Order of New Brunswick
Governor General's Award-winning poets
Members of the Royal Canadian Academy of Arts
Canadian dramatists and playwrights in French
Canadian male dramatists and playwrights
20th-century Canadian male writers
21st-century Canadian politicians
Canadian male non-fiction writers
Canadian expatriates in France
Officers of the Order of Canada